"The Heat Is On" is a song written by Harold Faltermeyer and Keith Forsey, and recorded by Glenn Frey for the American film Beverly Hills Cop (1984). The song was published as a single and as the sixth track of the album Beverly Hills Cop: Original Motion Picture Soundtrack (1984).

History
According to Frey, he was invited to an early screening of the film, and about two months later was sent a demo of a song written by Keith Forsey and Harold Faltermeyer to be used in the film to see if he was interested in singing the song. Frey agreed, and recorded the vocal part in one day. The following day he played the guitar and recorded the background vocals, and was paid $15,000 for the work.

The mid-to-up-tempo recording featured a steady drumbeat, synthesizer, and guitar, with a repeated saxophone riff framing the lyrical message. The guitar solo is played by Frey himself.

Cash Box called it "a hard rocking outing featuring the distinctive vocals of ex-Eagle Frey" and added that it contains "a signature horn riff and some effective dynamics."  Billboard said it "features a bustling rock 'n' roll beat, electric organ (or equivalent) and a wailing sax."

The song became a major hit single, reaching No. 2 on the Billboard Hot 100 chart in March 1985, behind "Can't Fight This Feeling" by REO Speedwagon.  It was also popular internationally, reaching No. 2 on the Australian Singles Chart in 1985 and gaining peaks of No. 8 on the Canadian Singles Chart and No. 12 on the UK Singles Chart. In the United States, it is the highest charting solo single by any member of the Eagles.

The music video for the song received heavy MTV airplay. It showed a film editor assembling scenes for Beverly Hills Cop while Frey and a band played the song in the adjacent room, with action scenes from the movie then directly interspersed. Among the musicians shown in the video is saxophone player Beverly Dahlke-Smith (the actual recording being made by session horn player David Woodford) and Frey's long-time drummer, Michael Huey.

The recording subsequently appeared on Frey's albums Glenn Frey Live (1993) and Solo Collection (1995) as well as on some various-artists "top hits" collections.

The St. Louis Cardinals did a remix of this song when they went to the World Series in 1985 to face the Kansas City Royals.

Track listing

Personnel 
 Glenn Frey – lead and backing vocals, guitar solo
 Harold Faltermeyer – keyboards, bass
 Richie Zito – guitars
 Keith Forsey – drums, backing vocals
 David Woodford – saxophone

Charts

Weekly charts

Year-end charts

References

External links
 

1985 singles
Glenn Frey songs
Songs written by Harold Faltermeyer
Miami Heat
MCA Records singles
Songs written by Keith Forsey
Song recordings produced by Keith Forsey
1984 songs